Johnny da Silva Araújo or simply Johnny (born February 19, 1987 in Rio de Janeiro), is a Brazilian footballer, who currently plays for Atlético Monte Azul.

Notes

1987 births
Living people
Brazilian footballers
Sport Club Corinthians Paulista players
Clube Atlético Juventus players
Association football forwards
Footballers from Rio de Janeiro (city)